The 2012 AFF Futsal Championship was the ninth edition of the tournament which was held in Bangkok, Thailand from 19 April to 27 April 2012. It was originally scheduled for the 17 to 27 April but was moved back by two days at the request of the Timor-Leste Football Federation due to the majority of their players coming from the Police Force who are required to vote in the local elections, and would not be able to leave the country without doing so. All member nations of the ASEAN Football Federation (AFF) have entered except for Singapore.

Due to certain logistical complications, all matches were played at the Chanchai Acadium, after initially having a schedule of concurrent matches at Kiraves Indoor Stadium, Thai-Japanese Stadium.

Venue

Group stage 
All times are Indochina Time (ICT) - UTC+7

Group A

Group B

Knockout stage

Bracket

Semi-finals

Third place play-off

Final

Winner

Goalscorers 
List is incomplete due to unknown scorers in several matches
16 goals
  Kritsada Wongkaeo

13 goals
  Suphawut Thueanklang

11 goals
  Jetsada Chudech

8 goals
  Andri Kustiawan

7 goals

  Misagh Bahadoran

6 goals

  Syahidansyah Lubis
  Aref Ahamah
  Manuel Varela Pereira

5 goals

  Fawzul Mohamad
  Jirawat Sornwichian
  Apiwat Chaemcharoen

4 goals

  Septian Cahya
  Kita Souksabai
  Qaiser Khadir
  Tin Win Ko Ko

3 goals

  I Sothearith
  Ismail
  Tona Bounmalay
  Asmie Zahari
  Pyae Phyo Maung
  Nattawut Madlayan
  Jose Vong

2 goals

  Anaqi Sufi Bak
  Maziri Maidin
  Eung Slauth
  Randhyas Syamsul Bahri
  Saysana Inthavong
  Fariq Mohamad
  Zubaidee Alwi
  Kyaw Kyaw Tun
  Thanakorn Penpakul
  Luu Quynh Toan
  Tran Hoang Vinh

1 goal

  Faizul Jery Zaini
  Junaidi Jumat
  Noor Raimi Syahremy Karim
  Norazizam Roslan
  Seun Sangpavich
  Fachri Reza
  Karami Balfas
  Nur Ali
  Alounpadeth Phouangphet
  Khounsombath Phommaxay
  Nidnilanh Chanchaleune
  Chantavong
  Muizzudin Mohd Haris
  Aung Aung
  Than Wunna Aung
  Nattawat Luksanato
  Piyapan Rattana
  Bui Van Thang
  Nguyen Bao Quan
  Nguyen Quoc Bao
  Pham Thanh Tuan
  Tran Van Vu

Own goal
  Ulfi Aminuddin (For Thailand)

References

External links
 Old website (Archived)
 Official website

AFF Futsal Championship
Futsal
Futsal
International futsal competitions hosted by Thailand
AFF